= Don Sorenson =

American painter, born 1948

Donald Sorenson (1948-1985) was a queer painter and sculptor who was born and raised in Southern California. He is known for his abstract art style that pushed the boundaries of the contemporary art scene.

== Biography ==
Donald (Don) Sorenson was born in Glendale, California in 1948. He was an LA-based American painter and sculptor who mainly focused on producing abstract and line-work within his art. Being born during the Baby Boom era of the 20th century, Don and other contemporary artists at the time explored the realm of experimental art. Taking his passion further he would receive his education and master's degree of fine arts at the California State University Northridge. Don would continue his art career by going to hosting his own exhibitions and partaking in others all over the United States. He would go on to have his art featured in galleries in his native Southern California region, but also in cities such as Washington D.C., Albuquerque, and New York City. Don's art grew in popularity over the years and his work began to evolve. Going from work that was only line-work, to abstract renditions of Greek Gods. As his art career progressed, Don would contract AIDS, which he would struggle with but continue publishing work until 1985, the year he died.

== Notable art ==
Titles	Year
Architectural Digest	1981
Philosophy (study)	1982
The Birth of The Ring	1985

== Notable solo-exhibitions ==
Exhibition Title	Year	Location
Nicholas Wilder Gallery	1975	Los Angeles
Claire Copley Gallery	1976	Los Angeles
Mount St. Mary's College Fine Arts Gallery	1978	Los Angeles
Roy Boyd Gallery	1980	Chicago
Simard/Weber Gallery	1981	Los Angeles
Hunsaker/Schlesinger Gallery	1981	Los Angeles
Roy Boyd Gallery	1982	Los Angeles & Chicago

== Awards ==
1980- National Endowment for the Arts grant

1984- Young Talent Award Los Angeles County Museum of Art

== Bibliography ==
“Estate of Don Sorenson - Artists - Robert Berman Gallery.” Robert Berman Gallery, www.robertbermangallery.com/artists/estate-of-don-sorenson?view=slider. Accessed 15 Jan. 2022.

The Estate of Don Sorenson, where his art is described in great detail. There is even an analysis of his more well-known work.

Knight, Christopher. “Christopher Knight on Don Sorenson.” Artforum International, 1 Dec. 1979, www.artforum.com/print/reviews/197910/don-sorenson-67645.

A 1979 article printed in Artforum, by Christopher Knight, on the works of Don Sorenson. Where he takes note of how Don's art style has shifted over the years.

Muchnic, Suzanne. “ART REVIEW : A REVELATION OF SORENSON AND MIGHT-HAVE-BEEN.” Los Angeles Times, 12 Mar. 2019, www.latimes.com/archives/la-xpm-1986-05-13-ca-6170-story.html.

In a Los Angeles Times article, Don Sorenson is remembered for his work and contribution to the art world, highlighting several of his pieces and notable accomplishments within his career.
